Chetan may refer to:
 Chetan (name), an Indian and Nepalese given name
 Chetan, Iran, a village in Mazandaran Province, Iran
 Chetan, Kurdistan, a village in Kurdistan Province, Iran
 Lucian Chetan (born 1985), Romanian football player

See also
 Cheta (disambiguation)